The knockout stage of the women's football tournament at the 2020 Summer Olympics was played from 30 July to 6 August 2021. The top two teams from each group in the group stage, as well as the two best third-placed teams, qualified for the knockout stage.

All times listed are Japan Standard Time (UTC+9).

Format
In the knockout stage, if a match was level at the end of 90 minutes of normal playing time, extra time was played (two periods of 15 minutes each) and followed, if necessary, by a penalty shoot-out to determine the winner.

Combinations of matches in the quarter-finals
The specific match-ups involving the third-placed teams depended on which two third-placed teams qualified for the quarter-finals:

Qualified teams
The top two placed teams from each of the three groups, along with the two best-placed third teams, qualified for the knockout stage.

Bracket

Quarter-finals

Canada vs Brazil

Great Britain vs Australia

Sweden vs Japan

Netherlands vs United States

Semi-finals

United States vs Canada

Australia vs Sweden

Bronze medal match

Gold medal match

The gold medal match was originally scheduled to be held on 6 August 2021, 11:00, at National Stadium, Tokyo. Both teams requested a later kick-off time due to concerns about excessive heat; as the National Stadium was already booked for athletics events in the evening, the game was moved to 21:00 on the same day at the International Stadium Yokohama in Yokohama.

References

External links
Women's Olympic Football Tournament Tokyo 2020, FIFA.com

Knockout stage
Great Britain at the 2020 Women's Olympic Football Tournament